The Yamaha MT-09 is a street motorcycle of the MT series with an  liquid-cooled four-stroke 12-valve DOHC inline-three engine with crossplane crankshaft and a lightweight cast alloy frame. For 2018, the bike is now designated MT-09 in all markets.

Design and development 

The MT-09 competes against the Triumph Street Triple, Kawasaki Z900, and MV Agusta Brutale 800. It is intended to restore Yamaha's fortunes, as the factory has in recent years lost its reputation for innovation. The MT-09's product manager, Shun Miyazawa, said Yamaha had considered parallel-twins, inline-threes, inline-fours, and V-twins, but that the inline-three gave the "best solution" of power, torque, and low weight. Comparing the MT-09 to the Street Triple, he said the Triumph was a streetfighter, but the Yamaha was a "roadster motard".

Both the frame and the double-sided swingarm are made of lightweight alloy, which are cast in two pieces. The frame castings are bolted together at the headstock and at the rear, but the swingarm parts are welded together. The MT-09 is the first Yamaha motorcycle since the XS750 and XS850 to be powered by inline-three engines. Both are shaft-driven motorcycles produced from 1976 to 1981.

In 2017, the MT-09 was updated with fully adjustable suspension, traction control, antilock brakes, slipper clutch, LED headlights, and updated styling.

In October 2020, the MT-09 received the second update with a larger  engine.

Tracer 900/FJ-09/MT-09 Tracer 

The Tracer 900 (FJ-09 in North America) is a sport touring model introduced in 2015 based on the MT-09. From 2016, in Europe and the United Kingdom, the name changed to Tracer 900 from MT-09 Tracer. It differs from the MT-09 in a number of ways, including that it has a partial fairing, a larger fuel tank, ABS brakes, handguards, centerstand, a 12-volt power socket, traction control, revised fuel map, drive-by-wire throttle mapping with three selectable riding modes. The display is very similar to the XT1200Z Super Ténéré's. It also has LED headlights and taillight.

Related models 
Shun Miyazawa said buyers are moving away from the supersport bikes, adding, "(Yamaha) aim to create an older and younger brother and cousins (to the MT-09) - maybe the same capacity, but a slightly different concept". This was translated into the creation of the MT-07 (FZ-07 in North America), the XSR700, the XSR900 and the MT-10 (FZ-10 in North America).

Reception 
In Motor Cycle News, Michael Neeves said, "The MT-09 starts an exciting new era for Yamaha" and "The MT-09 is a roadster for all occasions. It’s fun". However, the ride-by-wire throttle was criticised as "snatchy". Cycle Worlds Kevin Cameron describes the styling as "V-Max meets Transformers Robot", "like a Supermono" and "an up-to-the-minute streetfighter, no bland revival of a 1970s' UJM. Call it a new synthesis." Cycle World named the FZ-09 'Best Standard' of 2015.

In an MCN 5-bike group test in 2015, the testers felt that the MT-09 Tracer was a better bike and better value than its four competitors, namely: a Triumph Tiger 800XRx and a Tiger Sport, a Honda Crossrunner, and a Ducati Hyperstrada.

See also 
List of motorcycles by type of engine

References

External links 

 

MT-09
Standard motorcycles
Motorcycles introduced in 2014